Rice, Rice, Hillman & Pedersen is a collaboration album by American guitarist Tony Rice, his brother, mandolinist Larry Rice, guitar and banjo player Herb Pedersen and guitar/bass player Chris Hillman, founding member of famous folk-rock band from late 1960s, the Byrds. It is their follow-up on the first album they made together in 1997,  Out Of The Woodwork.

Track listing 
"Doesn't Mean That Much Anymore" (Hillman) 2:33
 "Side Effects of Love" (Rice) 2:24
 "One of These Days" (Montgomery) 2:40
 "Never Ending Song of Love" (Bramlett) 3:07
 "Friend of the Devil" (Dawson, Garcia, Hunter) 3:16
 "Out Among the Stars" (Mithell) 4:14
 "Moonshine" (Buchanan) 3:37
 "Moment of Glory" (Hillman) 3:21
 "The Year of El Nino" (Rice) 4:34
 "Hearts Overflowing" (Brewer) 4:17
 "I Will" (Hillman) 2:45
 "The Walkin' Blues" (Hillman) 2:33
 "I'll Be On That Good Road Someday" (Philips) 3:00

Personnel
 Tony Rice – guitar
 Larry Rice – mandolin, vocals
 Chris Hillman – bass, guitar, vocals
 Herb Pedersen – banjo, guitar, vocals

with
 Fred Travers – Dobro
 Ronnie Simpkins – bass
 Rickie Simpkins – violin

References

1999 albums
Tony Rice albums
Rounder Records albums